Hydrocina is a genus of fungi within the Hyaloscyphaceae family. This is a monotypic genus, containing the single species Hydrocina chaetocladia.

References

External links
Hydrocina at Index Fungorum

Hyaloscyphaceae
Monotypic Leotiomycetes genera